Rubber Duck is a series of several giant floating sculptures of yellow rubber ducks, designed by Dutch artist Florentijn Hofman, which have appeared in many cities around the world, including Hong Kong, Pittsburgh, Toronto, Kaohsiung, Baku, London and Sydney. Each Rubber Duck is recreated anew locally, as his public art is intended to be temporary.

Artist
Rubber Duck was created by Dutch artist Florentijn Hofman. In a 2013 interview, Hofman stated that his initial inspiration came from a 2001 museum visit combined with a popular yoghurt advertisement in the Netherlands in 2000 or 2001. He searched to find what he considered the perfect toy duck and settled on a design by a Hong Kong company called Tolo Toys. The yoghurt company Yogho!Yogho! financed the work.

Sculpture

Design
The size of the rubber duck varies. The rubber duck was constructed with more than 200 pieces of PVC. All the pieces of PVC are connected by hand with sewing machines.

In order to enhance the duck's durability, they added another piece on top of one layer. On the rubber duck, there is an opening at the back of the body so that architects and staff can perform a body check of the rubber duck. In addition, there is an electric propeller fan in its body so that it can be inflated at any time, in either good or bad weather. The loops that are in the pontoon edges of the rubber duck are connected to the fence of the lake by 16 ropes that are designed to hold the rubber duck still without it floating away by the waves of the lake water. On the bottom of the rubber duck, there is a waterproof cable that gets the energy from a power distribution board near the lake to make the electric propeller fan work. The electric propeller fan also keeps the air circulating inside of the rubber duck, so that the air always keeps the shape of the rubber duck sculpture.

Display

Since 2007, the ducks have been on display in Amsterdam, Baku, Lommel (Belgium), Osaka, Sydney Harbour, São Paulo, and Hong Kong. It was on display in Pittsburgh as its first U.S. destination, from 27 September 2013 through 20 October 2013. Over 1,000,000 people are reported to have visited the duck in Pittsburgh. Its second United States appearance was in Norfolk, Virginia, from 17 to 26 May 2014, floating in The Hague Inlet in front of the Chrysler Museum of Art.

In October 2014, South Korea's Lotte group asked for the giant rubber duck to celebrate the opening of the new Lotte World Mall, the country's largest shopping mall that also has a skyscraper, Lotte World Tower. The tower is located between the Han River and Seokchon Lake, where the giant rubber duck was placed. However, the duck deflated during the exhibition.

In 2009, while it was on display in Belgium, vandals stabbed Rubber Duck 42 times. While on display in Hong Kong in 2013, it deflated on 15 May. It was re-inflated and was again on exhibition on 20 May. It was damaged and deflated again in Taiwan on 2 November after an earthquake, before bursting at Keelung, Taiwan, on 31 December 2013. The duck was reported as having been swept away in recent floods in China. On 30 September 2017, during its exhibition in Santiago, the duck accidentally crashed into a sign, which tore a hole on its structure and caused it to deflate.

A "counterfeit" version of the duck went on tour around Canada in 2017 for Canada's sesquicentennial. The tour drew some controversy as it was seen by some as a waste of government spending; however reports later found that the sculpture generated profits for the events it attended. This version was not approved by Studio Florentijn Hofman.

Censorship 

On 4 June 2013, China's most popular microblogging website Sina Weibo blocked the term "Big Yellow Duck" to prevent users from posting pictures of the sculpture digitally altered in front of Tank Man, a heavily censored subject in the country. If the blocked term was searched, a message would say: "According to relevant laws, statutes and policies, [the results of the search] cannot be shown."

List of locations 
The Rubber Duck has made appearances in the following locations:
 Saint-Nazaire, France, 2007
 São Paulo, Brazil, 2008
 Osaka, Japan, December 2010
 Auckland, New Zealand, February 2011
 Onomichi, Japan, 2012
 Hasselt, Belgium, July 2012
 Sydney, New South Wales, Australia, January 2013
 Tsim Sha Tsui, Kowloon, Hong Kong, May 2013
 Pittsburgh, Pennsylvania, United States, September 2013
 Beijing, China, September 2013
 Baku, Azerbaijan, September 2013
 Kaohsiung, Taiwan (ROC), September 2013
 Taoyuan, Taiwan (ROC), 26 October 2013
 Keelung, Taiwan (ROC), 20 December 2013
 Parramatta, Australia, 10–19 January 2014
 Ho Chi Minh City, Vietnam, 27 April – 31 May 2014
 Norfolk, Virginia, United States, 17–26 May 2014
 Hangzhou, Zhejiang, PR China, 30 May – 15 July 2014
 Los Angeles, California, United States, August 2014
 Seoul, South Korea, 14 October 2014 – 14 November 2014
 Shanghai, PR China, 23 October 2014 – 23 November 2014
 Macau, 29 April 2016 – 27 May 2016
 Harbin, Heilongjiang, PR China, July–August 2016
 Toronto, Canada, 1 July 2017 – 3 July 2017
 Santiago and Valparaíso, Chile, 28 September 2017 – 8 October 2017
 Seoul, South Korea, 30 September 2022 – 31 October 2022

Gallery

See also
 Friendly Floatees
 Ego Leonard

References

 Avenuel Art Hall, Lotte Gallery. Rubber Duck Project Seoul. Seoul, 2014. Print.
 Rubber Duck Project-Seoul, Artist visited Korea (러버덕프로젝트-서울, 방한) Lee, Minji. "Giant rubber duck enthralls citizens despite Lotte controversy." Yonhap News 20 Oct. 2014. Web.
 Giant rubber duck enthralls citizens despite Lotte controversy Rubberdcukproject Seoul. "Rubber Duck Project-Seoul, Artist visited Korea." Online video clip. YouTube. YouTube, 31 Oct. 2014. Web. 4 Mar. 2016.

External links

 Rubber Duck Osaka 2009
 Rubber Duck Hong Kong 2013
 Hong Kong Harbour City: Rubber Duck Project – HK Tour
 Timable Event: Rubber Duck Project HK Tour
 The Seoul Rubber Duck Project: An Ideological Dichotomy
 Tolo Toys Classic Bath Duck

2007 sculptures
Animal sculptures
Fictional ducks
Sculptures of birds
Works by Dutch people